Battle of Damghan was a battle fought during the Seljuk war of succession of 1063.

Background
The Seljuks were an Oghuz Turk dynasty that founded the Seljuk Empire in Iran during the 11th century. The founder of the empire, Tughril, died childless and willed the throne to Alp Arslan, son of his brother Chaghri Beg. After Tughril's death however, the Seljuk prince Qutalmish hoped to become the new sultan, because Tughril was childless and he was the eldest living member of the dynasty.

Qutalmish's claim to the sultanate was through his father, Arslan Yabgu who was the eldest son of Seljuk. Arslan, however, was captured by Mahmud of Ghazni and died whilst imprisoned. Consequently, Tughril, Qutalmish's cousin, became sultan.

Early moves 
Tughril died on 4 September 1063. Upon the news of Tughril's death, both Qutalmish and Alp Arslan (Suleiman's elder brother) began marching to capital Rey to seize the throne. Qutalmish held the advantage because his fort Girdkuh was closer to the capital than Alp Arslan's possessions in the east. But Tughril's vizier Al-Kunduri who initially supported Suleiman, feared Qutalmish, and began supporting Alp Arslan. Nevertheless, Qutalmish and his brother Resul easily defeated Al Kunduri's forces and they laid siege to Rey on 15 November 1063. Qutalmish was forced to lift the siege to face the approaching army of Alp Arslan. He moved east and defeated the vanguard forces of Hacib Erdem, a commander of Alp Arslan in Dihinemek, a place close to Damghan.

The clash
Alp Arslan's main army was about 15 km east of Qutalmish. Qutalmish tried to change the course of a creek to block Alp Arslan's way. However Alp Arslan was able to pass his army through the newly created marsh land. Once the two Seljuk armies met, Qutalmish's forces fled from the battle. Resul  as well as Qutalmish's son Suleiman (later founder of the Sultanate of Rum) were taken prisoner. Qutalmish escaped, but while gathering his forces for an orderly retreat to his fort Girdkuh, he fell from his horse in a hilly terrain and died on 7 December 1063.

Aftermath
Although Qutalmish's son Suleiman was taken prisoner, Alp Arslan pardoned him and sent him into exile. But later this proved to be an opportunity for him; for he founded the Sultanate of Rum, which outlasted the Great Seljuk Empire.

References

1063 in Asia
11th century in the Seljuk Empire
Damghan
Damghan
Wars of succession involving the states and peoples of Asia